Bill Mayo (born April 26, 1963) is a former American football offensive guard who played college football at the University of Tennessee and attended Dalton High School in Dalton, Georgia. He was a consensus All-American in 1984. Mayo was also named first-team All-SEC in 1983 and 1984. He was a four-year starter at Tennessee, only missing one game and starting 46.

References

Living people
1963 births
Players of American football from Georgia (U.S. state)
American football offensive guards
Tennessee Volunteers football players
All-American college football players
People from Dalton, Georgia